Islamic bioethics, or Islamic medical ethics, ( al-akhlaq al-tibbiyyah) refers to Islamic guidance on ethical or moral issues relating to medical and scientific fields, in particular, those dealing with human life.

Introduction 
In Islam, human life is regarded as an invaluable gift from God, and should therefore be both respected and protected. This is evident in many Qur’anic verses or ayat, one of the most important being:

"if anyone slays a human being, unless it be [in punishment] for murder or spreading corruption on earth, it shall be as though he had slain all mankind; whereas, if anyone saves a life, it shall be as though he had saved the lives of all mankind."(Qur’an 5:32)

It is this verse which has ultimately fueled the interest in Islamic bioethics and within it exist two basic principles which ensure that the sanctity of human life is preserved:
 Saving a life is obligatory.
 Unjustified taking of a life is classified as murder and, thus, forbidden.

Though Muslims recognize and maintain that Allah is the ultimate source of life (Qur’an 2:258), the Qur’an illustrates that God has instilled in them reason, free will, the ability to distinguish between what is morally acceptable and what is unacceptable (Qur’an 91:8) while also supplying the provisions of nature (Qur’an 45:13). With these things, Muslims are held responsible for maintaining health and preventing illness. In the event that illness occurs, Muslims are obliged to seek medical treatment in a manner which is Islamically appropriate and permissible.

Sources
The fundamental basis of Islamic bioethics is that all rulings and actions must fall into accordance with Islamic law (shari’a) and Islamic ethics. By evaluating bioethical issues from and ethical and legal standpoint, jurists can issue decrees or fatwas regarding the permissibility of the pertaining subject. Any rule that has not been explicitly outlined in the religious texts or formulated from them by jurists is referred to as bid‘ah (innovation) and, therefore, is haram (impermissible). For this reason, all medical procedures and treatments, as well as conduct between patient and medical professional must be legitimized by the sources of Islamic law,

 Qur’an,
 Hadith or Sunnah
 Ijtihad
 In Sunni Islam, ijtihad includes qiyas (analogy), ijma (consensus), maslaha (public welfare) and ‘urf (customary practice)
 In Shi’a Islam it is composed solely of al-'aql (reason)

Principles
Principles of bioethics in the Western world were first developed and outlined by two American philosophers and bioethicists, Tom Beauchamp and James F. Childress, in their book, Principles of Biomedical Ethics. The concept of bioethical principles has since been regarded as a purely “Western” innovation which is absent in the Islamic health care system. These bioethical principles: autonomy, beneficence, non-maleficence and justice have been legitimized by Muslims jurists as falling into the sphere of Islamic law and have also been supported by Qur’anic verses (Qur'an 3:104, 16:90 and 17:70). They have subsequently become the foundational spirit underlying the Oath of the Muslim Doctor Islamset-Islamic Ethics-Islamic Code of Medical Ethics-The Oath of the Doctor and, thus, dictate the conduct between a Muslim physician and his or her patient.

Authority 
Formulations of rulings on bioethical issues in the Islamic context generally arise due to some form of deliberation between medical professionals and religious authority who have been recognized as most qualified individuals of location or time period. After being approached by health care officials, a member of the religious authority (mufti) may then consult the religious texts and determine whether or not a specific issue is obligatory (wajib/fard), recommended (mustahabb), neutral (mubah), discouraged (makruh) or forbidden (haram).

Modernity
As health care and science have progressed over time, and the Muslim population has also increased to over one billion adherents over every continent on the globe, there have been increasingly prevalent circumstances for the evaluation of technological applications and bioethical issues to determine how they fit into the Islamic sphere. As a result, larger bodies of Islamic committees have been formed to address issues at hand. National Committees of Medical Ethics/Bioethics have been formed in many Islamic countries which work together with ulema to issue fatwas ensuring that neither the progress of medical science is hindered, nor the Islamic code of bioethics is jeopardized. The importance of Islamic law (sharia’) is so heavily valued that each issue is looked at independently and subsequently deemed permissible or impermissible. Specific issues addressed in the modern scientific era include abortion, fertility treatments, family planning, euthanasia, genetic research, cloning, stem cell research among many other issues.

Islamic Medical and Scientific Ethics Project
The Islamic Medical and Scientific Ethics (IMSE) Project is a multinational effort to produce a comprehensive collection of Islamic bioethics resources. Project staff members at two Georgetown University libraries, the Bioethics Research Library (Washington) and the School of Foreign Service-Qatar Library (Doha), have already compiled over 1,000 relevant written works into the IMSE Special Collection and have entered them into the searchable IMSE Database. The IMSE Project is funded by the Qatar National Research Fund (QNRF), a member of the Qatar Foundation for Education, Science and Community Development.

Notes

References 

Bioethics
Islam and science
Islamic ethics
Philosophy of science